John Roger Voudouris (December 29, 1954 – August 3, 2003) was an American singer-songwriter/guitarist best known for his 1979 hit, "Get Used to It".

Voudouris was born in Sacramento, California and formed Roger Voudouris' Loud as Hell Rockers while still attending C.K. McClatchy High School, entering regular performances at the Elegant Barn Nightclub.  That band would later enjoy small success while performing as an opening act for The Doobie Brothers, Stephen Stills, and John Mayall. Voudouris also performed in Voudouris/Kahne with David Kahne, prior to being signed by Warner Bros. Records as a solo act.

His first solo album was the self-titled Roger Voudouris released in 1978; it received little interest from radio or other media. However, his second album Radio Dream contained the pop hit "Get Used to It" which peaked at No. 21 in June 1979 on the Billboard Hot 100 and reached No. 4 in Australia. Voudouris performed the song on the Merv Griffin Show.

Radio Dream was followed a year later with the 1980 album A Guy Like Me and the 1981 album On the Heels of Love.  While A Guy Like Me and On the Heels of Love did not achieve the success of his previous album, Voudouris did achieve quite a large amount of success in Japan where his musical style was very popular. He also became a small cult-figure in Australia after appearing on the popular music television program Countdown in August 1979. In his appearance on the show he wore a figure hugging outfit with brown leather trousers while miming "Get Used to It" into a wind machine, which made his long hair flow: it led to his brief status as a sex symbol in that country.

After the decline of his solo career, Voudouris returned to writing music and lyrics for various projects including the movie The Lonely Lady starring Pia Zadora, and a documentary on the life of Elvis Presley.

Voudouris died in 2003 after suffering from liver disease for some time. He was survived by three children from his first marriage, his former wife, and his then-wife, Jennifer (from whom he was separated).

Discography

Albums

Singles

References

External links/references
 
 Link to Sacramento Bee, who published an obituary on Voudouris in August, 2003 (access to obit not free)
 
 

1954 births
2003 deaths
American people of Greek descent
Deaths from hepatitis
Singer-songwriters from California
Musicians from Sacramento, California
American rock guitarists
American male guitarists
American rock singers
Windham Hill Records artists
Lead guitarists
American male singer-songwriters
Warner Records artists
American rock songwriters
Deaths from liver disease
20th-century American guitarists
Guitarists from California
20th-century American male singers
20th-century American singers